François l'Hermite (c. 16017 September 1655) was a French dramatist who wrote under the name Tristan l'Hermite. He was born at the Château de Soliers in the Haute Marche.

Life
His adventures began early, for he killed his enemy in a duel at the age of thirteen, and was obliged to flee to England. He was, in succession, poet to Gaston d'Orléans, to the duchesse de Chaulnes and the duke of Guise.

His first tragedy, Marianne (1636), was also his best. It was followed by Penthée (1637), La Mort de Seneque (1644), La Mort de Crispe (1645) and the Parasite (1654). He was also the author of some admirable lyrics. Three of his best plays are printed in the Théâtre français of 1737.

He took his pseudonym from Tristan l'Hermite, a shadowy figure of the late Middle Ages who was provost of the marshals of the King's household under Louis XI of France.

He died due to tuberculosis.

References

Attribution:

External links
  
 L'Hermite, François Tristan. Poésies, edited by Philip A. Wadsworth, 1962.
 L'Hermite, François Tristan. Les Vers héroïques, edited by Catherine M. Grisé, 1967.
 Abraham, Claude K., Jerome Schweitzer, and Jacqueline Vam Baelen, editors, Le Théâtre complet de Tristan L'Hermite, 1975.
 Abraham, Claude K. The Strangers: Tragic World of Tristan L'Hermite, 1969, 1989.

1600s births
1655 deaths
Members of the Académie Française
17th-century French male writers
17th-century French novelists
17th-century French dramatists and playwrights
17th-century French poets
17th-century deaths from tuberculosis
Tuberculosis deaths in France
Baroque writers